Ozerne is an urban-type settlement in Zhytomyr Raion, Zhytomyr Oblast, Ukraine. Population: . In 2001, population was 5,913. It is home to a military air base.

References

Urban-type settlements in Zhytomyr Raion
Zhytomyr Raion